The Florence Post Office, at 121 N. Pikes Peak St. in Florence, Colorado, was built in 1936.  It was listed on the National Register of Historic Places in 1986 as US Post Office-Florence Main.

It was designed by Louis A. Simon in Starved Classical style.

It includes a WPA mural painted by Olive Rush in 1937, showing a group of antelope.

References

National Register of Historic Places in Fremont County, Colorado
Neoclassical architecture in Colorado
Art Deco architecture in Colorado
Government buildings completed in 1936
Post office buildings on the National Register of Historic Places in Colorado